"Resurrecting" is a song performed by American contemporary worship band Elevation Worship. Written by Chris Brown, Mack Brock, Matthews Ntlele, Steven Furtick, and Wade Joye, the song was released as the second single from their 2016 album Here as in Heaven. It was released to Christian radio on December 26, 2018. The song peaked at No. 3 on the US Hot Christian Songs chart, becoming their third Top 10 single from the chart. The song is played in a D-flat major key, and 74 beats per minute.

Background
"Resurrecting" was released as the second single from their fifth live album Here as in Heaven. It was released to Christian radio on December 26, 2018. It was recorded live at Spectrum Center in Charlotte, North Carolina.

Composition
"Resurrecting" is originally in the key of D-flat major, with a tempo of 74 beats per minute. Written in common time, the vocal range spans from C4 to F5 during the song.

Track listing

Music videos
The lyric video of "Resurrecting" was published on YouTube on January 11, 2019. The live music video of "Resurrecting", recorded at Elevation Church's Ballantyne campus in Charlotte, North Carolina was released on January 14, 2019, through YouTube. An acoustic video was also released on January 24, 2019. The lyric video of the song's Spanish version titled "Él Que Resucito (Resurrecting)" was released on August 22, 2017, via YouTube.

Charts

Weekly charts

Year-end charts

Certifications

Release history

References

2016 songs
2018 singles
Elevation Worship songs
Songs written by Steven Furtick